The Ministry of Defence Production, is a Cabinet-level ministry of Pakistan government concerned with the development and production of the full range of equipment and stores for the Pakistan Armed Forces ranging from platforms such as main battle tanks and multi-role combat aircraft to guided weapons, small arms, uniforms and unguided munitions of all calibres. The current Defense Production Minister of Pakistan is Muhammad Israr Tareen.

Leadership
Muhammad Israr Tareen is the Minister of Defence Production; Lt. General (Retd) Humayun Aziz is the Federal Secretary, and Major General Ghulam Jafar is additional secretary based at Calcutta House in Rawalpindi.

The ministry's bureaucracy is split into three wings, administration, projects, and foreign collaboration, each overseen by an assistant secretary.

A list of the ministry's organisations is provided at the bottom of the page.

History
With the creation of Pakistan, a Directorate General Supply and Development was established under Ministry of Defence. In 1953, it was reorganised as Defence Purchase Directorate.

The embargo imposed by Western powers on India and Pakistan during the war of 1965 led to the establishment of Directorate General Munitions Production and Procurement in 1967.

This was bifurcated in 1970 into the Directorate General of Munitions Defence Purchase and the Directorate General of Munitions Procurement.

The first emphasis was small arms and the production of munitions by POF through tie-ups and technology-transfers from friendly states in the East and West, however the experience of the 1971 highlighted the attraction of greater self-sufficiency in major weapon systems.

As a result the Defence Production Division was established within the Pakistan Ministry of Defence in 1972 by President Zulfiqar Ali Bhutto who appointed Abdul Hamid as secretary in charge of the division.

Significant investments were made through the 1970s and 1980s to establish enterprises such as Heavy Industries Taxila and Pakistan Aeronautical Complex with assistance from the People's Republic of China in particular, as well European defence companies from countries such as France and Sweden.

In 2004 under President Pervez Musharraf the MoD's Defence Production Division was upgraded to a separate Ministry of Defence Production headed by a federal minister. However, the Ministry of Defence retained control over NESCOM given its role in the development and production of strategic weapons.

Organizations
 Defence Export Promotion Organization
 Directorate General Defence Purchase
 Directorate General Munitions Production
 Military Vehicles Research and Development Establishment
 Armament Research and Development Establishment
 Institute of Optronics 
 Heavy Industries Taxila
 Heavy Rebuild Factory (T-Series)
 Heavy Rebuild Factory (M-Series)
 Advance System Rebuild Factory
 Tank Manufacturing Factory
 Armoured Personnel Carrier Factory
 Gun Manufacturing Factory
 Pakistan Aeronautical Complex
 Aircraft Rebuild Factory
 Mirage Rebuild Factory
 Aircraft Manufacturing Factory
 Avionics Production Factory
Karachi Shipyard & Engineering Works Limited
 Pakistan Ordnance Factories
 Wah Industries Ltd.
 National Radio and Telecommunication Corporation
 Global Industrial Defence Solutions (export oriented conventional technologies & services developed by NESCOM)
 Advance Engineering Research Organisation
 Integrated Defence System
 Maritime Systems Pvt. Limited
 Institute of Industrial Control System
  Al-technique Corporation
 Scientific Engineering & Technology Services
 Xpert Engineering Services

List of Ministers

See also
 Defence industry of Pakistan
 Ministry of Maritime Affairs (Pakistan)

References

External links
 

Defence production
Defence industry of Pakistan
Defence